Greenhills School is an independent college preparatory school (grades 6–12) in Ann Arbor, Michigan, United States.

Awards and recognition
Greenhills Upper School was recognized as one of six national Intel Schools of Distinction in 2007 for excellence as one of the nation's top schools for science. The program recognizes one school for math and one for science in each of three school ranges (elementary, middle and high school).

Athletics
Greenhills School is a member of the Michigan High School Athletic Association (MHSAA) and offers the following sports:

Boys: tennis, baseball, basketball, cross country, golf, lacrosse, soccer, and track and field
Girls: tennis, basketball, cross country, field hockey, golf, soccer, softball, track and field, and volleyball
Coed: equestrian and swimming. However, both the track and cross country teams have co-ed practices.

The boys tennis team won the Division 4 Lower Peninsula state championship in 2003–4, 2006-7 and 2008-9 through 2015–16. They also won again in 2018. In 2019 the team moved up to division three and won their first state championship there. The team went undefeated that season and ended up as the top ranked team across all divisions - #1 in the power rankings. Their coach, Eric Gajar, was named coach of the year for the state of Michigan. Since 2001, MHSAA has not crowned a true state champion in tennis, opting instead for separate tournaments for the Upper and Lower peninsulas.

In 2017, the men's  soccer team won the Division 4 state championship. Jerry Tucker, a senior, scored the lone goal of the match to send the Gryphons to a 1–0 victory.

Renovation
Greenhills school has begun an expansion project planned to provide an additional  of space. Much of this space will be used for the sciences, including biology labs and a greenhouse. Of the $6.5 million required for the project, the school has raised $3 million, enough that they began the first phase of construction on 6/9/2009.
The proposed renovations also include a geothermal heating and cooling system, allowing the project to be certified as LEED gold certified.

Notable alumni
Eugene Kang, Special Assistant to President Barack Obama
Elizabeth Meriwether, playwright and screenwriter
Nicholas Phan, lyric tenor
Andrew W.K., rock singer, record producer and actor

References

External links
 Greenhills School official website

High schools in Ann Arbor, Michigan
Private middle schools in Michigan
Private high schools in Michigan
Educational institutions established in 1968
Preparatory schools in Michigan
Alden B. Dow buildings
1969 establishments in Michigan